Graham Edwards may refer to:

Graham Edwards (politician) (born 1946), Australian politician
Graham Edwards (writer) (born 1965), English novelist
Jock Edwards (Graham Neil Edwards, 1955–2020), New Zealand cricketer
Graham Edwards (Zimbabwean cricketer) (1970), former Zimbabwean cricketer
Graham Edwards (musician)
Graham Edwards (footballer) (born 1936), English footballer active in the Netherlands